Bree B.B.C. is a former professional basketball team based in Bree, Belgium. The club was dissolved in 2010, after going bankrupt. The club played multiple years as a professional team in the Ethias League and played its home games in the Tilmans Expo Centre.

History
Bree became the Belgian league champion for the first time in 2005, and played in the Eurocup the year after. In the Eurocup 2005-06 season, Bree finished in 3rd place in Group A with a 5-5 record, and lost to Hapoel Jerusalem in the 1/8 finals. They finished in 3rd place in the Ethias League in 2006, in 2nd place in the league in 2007 and 2008. Before the 2008–09 season, Bree was denied to enter the league because of their financial situation. The team played the next season in the national second league, de Tweede Nationale. The team won the championship that season, but a year later the club went bankrupt and was dissolved.

Season by season

Honors and titles
Belgian League: 
Champions (1): 2004–05

Belgian Supercup: 
Winners (1): 2005

Belgian Second Division:
Champions (1): 2008–09

Notable players

 Eric Hinrichsen (2002–03)
 Donatas Zavackas (2004–05)
 Julius Jenkins (2005–06)
 D'or Fischer (2007–08)

Defunct basketball teams in Belgium
Basketball teams established in 1960
Basketball teams disestablished in 2010